GreenPark Christian Academy is a K-12 Christian school in St. Louis, Missouri operated by a ministry of the GreenPark community church    It opened in 2006.

References

External links
GreenPark Community Church Website

Private schools in St. Louis
Middle schools in St. Louis